Erbé is a comune (municipality) in the Province of Verona in the Italian region Veneto, located about  west of Venice and about  south of Verona.

Erbé borders the following municipalities: Castelbelforte, Isola della Scala, Nogara, Sorgà, and Trevenzuolo.

Demographic evolution

References

Cities and towns in Veneto